Anteos is a genus of butterflies in the family Pieridae, commonly called angled-sulphurs.

Species
Listed alphabetically:
Anteos clorinde (Godart, [1824]) – white angled sulphur or white angled-sulphur
Anteos maerula (Fabricius, 1775) – angled sulphur or yellow angled-sulphur
Anteos menippe (Hübner, [1818]) – orange-tipped angled-sulphur

References

External links
Anteos

Coliadinae
Pieridae of South America
Pieridae genera
Taxa named by Jacob Hübner